Christopher James Griffiths (born 20 November 1971) is an English cricketer.  Griffiths is a right-handed batsman who bowls right-arm medium pace.  He was born in Bradford, Yorkshire.

Griffiths represented the Leicestershire Cricket Board in 3 List A matches.  These came against Hertfordshire in the 1999 NatWest Trophy, the Durham Cricket Board in the 2000 NatWest Trophy and the Northamptonshire Cricket Board in the 1st round of the 2002 Cheltenham & Gloucester Trophy which was played in 2001.

In his 3 List A matches, he scored 38 runs at a batting average of 19.00, with a high score of 25.  With the ball he took 4 wickets at a bowling average of 22.50, with best figures of 2/19.

He currently plays club cricket for Market Harborough Cricket Club in the Leicestershire Premier Cricket League.

References

External links
Christopher Griffiths at Cricinfo

1971 births
Living people
English cricketers
Leicestershire Cricket Board cricketers
Cricketers from Bradford
English cricketers of 1969 to 2000
English cricketers of the 21st century